Amara convexa is a species of seed-eating ground beetle in the family Carabidae. It is found in North America.

References

Further reading

 

convexa
Articles created by Qbugbot
Beetles described in 1847
Taxa named by John Lawrence LeConte